Drayford is a village in the English county of Devon, approximately 15 miles north west of Exeter.

External links

Villages in Devon